In mathematics, a Brieskorn manifold or Brieskorn–Phạm manifold,  introduced by , is the intersection of a small sphere around the origin with the singular, complex hypersurface

Brieskorn manifolds give examples of exotic spheres.

References

 This book describes Brieskorn's work relating exotic spheres to singularities of complex manifolds.

Singularity theory